Johann Klemm or Klemme (c. 1593–1660) was a German Baroque organist and composer.

Klemm was a pupil of Heinrich Schütz and organist at the Dresden court. As was normal for students to publish the works of their teachers, in 1647, together with Alexander Hering, he published Schütz's Symphoniae sacrae II.

Works, editions, recordings
German madrigals for four, five, and six voices (Freiburg, 1629)
Partitura seu tabulatura italica, a collection of 36 fugues in open score (Dresden, 1631).

References

1590s births
1660 deaths
17th-century classical composers
German Baroque composers
German classical composers
German male classical composers
German organists
German male organists
Musicians from Dresden
Pupils of Heinrich Schütz
17th-century male musicians